Money for Nothing may refer to:

Books
 Money for Nothing (novel), a 1928 novel by P. G. Wodehouse

Film
 Money for Nothing (1916 film), a film starring Guy Newall 
 Money for Nothing (1932 film), a British film
 Money for Nothing (1993 film), a film starring John Cusack
 Money for Nothing, a 1993 TV film by Mike Ockrent
 Money for Nothing: Inside the Federal Reserve, 2013 film

Television 
 Money for Nothing (TV programme), a 2015 British television programme narrated by Arthur Smith that airs on BBC One
 "Money for Nothing" (CSI: Miami), an episode of the TV series CSI: Miami

Music
 "Money for Nothing" (song), a song by Dire Straits
 "Money for Nothing/Beverly Hillbillies*", a parody cover of the Dire Straits song by "Weird Al" Yankovic
 Money for Nothing (album), a greatest hits collection by Dire Straits
 "Money for Nothing" (Darin song)

See also
Monkeys for Nothin' and the Chimps for Free, a 2007 album by Reel Big Fish